The Texas sharpshooter fallacy is an informal fallacy which is committed when differences in data are ignored, but similarities are overemphasized. From this reasoning, a false conclusion is inferred. This fallacy is the philosophical or rhetorical application of the multiple comparisons problem (in statistics) and apophenia (in cognitive psychology). It is related to the clustering illusion, which is the tendency in human cognition to interpret patterns where none actually exist.

The name comes from a joke about a Texan who fires some gunshots at the side of a barn, then paints a shooting target centered on the tightest cluster of hits and claims to be a sharpshooter.

Structure 

The Texas sharpshooter fallacy often arises when a person has a large amount of data at their disposal but only focuses on a small subset of that data. Some factor other than the one attributed may give all the elements in that subset some kind of common property (or pair of common properties, when arguing for correlation). If the person attempts to account for the likelihood of finding some subset in the large data with some common property by a factor other than its actual cause, then that person is likely committing a Texas sharpshooter fallacy.

The fallacy is characterized by a lack of a specific hypothesis prior to the gathering of data, or the formulation of a hypothesis only after data have already been gathered and examined. Thus, it typically does not apply if one had an ex ante, or prior, expectation of the particular relationship in question before examining the data. For example, one might, prior to examining the information, have in mind a specific physical mechanism implying the particular relationship. One could then use the information to give support or cast doubt on the presence of that mechanism. Alternatively, if additional information can be generated using the same process as the original information, one can use the original information to construct a hypothesis, and then test the hypothesis on the new data. (See hypothesis testing.) What one cannot do is use the same information to construct and test the same hypothesis (see hypotheses suggested by the data)—to do so would be to commit the Texas sharpshooter fallacy.

Examples 
A Swedish study in 1992 tried to determine whether power lines caused some kind of poor health effects. The researchers surveyed people living within 300 meters of high-voltage power lines over 25 years and looked for statistically significant increases in rates of over 800 ailments. The study found that the incidence of childhood leukemia was four times higher among those who lived closest to the power lines, and it spurred calls to action by the Swedish government. The problem with the conclusion, however, was that the number of potential ailments, i.e., over 800, was so large that it created a high probability that at least one ailment would exhibit the appearance of a statistically significant difference by chance alone, a situation known as the multiple comparisons problem. Subsequent studies failed to show any association between power lines and childhood leukemia.

The fallacy is often found in modern-day interpretations of the quatrains of Nostradamus. Nostradamus's quatrains are often liberally translated from the original (archaic) French, stripped of their historical context, and then applied to support the conclusion that Nostradamus predicted a given modern-day event after the event actually occurred.

See also

Related fallacies

References

External links 
 Fallacy files entry

Causal fallacies
Metaphors referring to war and violence
Marksmanship
Cognitive biases